The MacGregor Ward is a ward in the Brisbane City Council in Queensland, Australia. It covers MacGregor, Eight Mile Plains, Robertson, Upper Mt Gravatt and Wishart.

Councillors for MacGregor Ward

Results

References 

City of Brisbane wards